Medad is a Hebrew masculine name with the meaning of friendship and love.

References

Hebrew masculine given names